Come Fly with Me may refer to:

Music 

 "Come Fly with Me" (1958 song), a popular song written by Jimmy Van Heusen and Sammy Cahn, and the title track of:
 Come Fly with Me (Frank Sinatra album), 1958
 Come Fly with Me (Michael Bublé album)
 Come Fly with Me (Peter Andre album)
 "Come Fly with Me" (Foxy Brown song)
 Come Fly with Me, the original title for the dance revue Come Fly Away

Film and television 

 Come Fly with Me (film), a 1963 comedy about stewardesses
 Come Fly with Me (1976 film), a Hong Kong film of 1976
 Come Fly with Me (2009 film), an Australian short film partially shot at Bankstown Airport
 Come Fly with Me (1958 TV series), a Canadian music variety show
 Come Fly with Me (2010 TV series), a British 'mockumentary' sketch show starring David Walliams and Matt Lucas
 "Come Fly with Me" (Modern Family), an episode of the TV series Modern Family
 "Come Fly with Me", an episode of the American sitcom Full House
 "Come Fly with Me", an episode of the Disney animated series Goof Troop
 "Come Fly with Me", an episode of the American sitcom Lizzie McGuire
 "Come Fly with Me", an episode of the American sitcom Twenty Good Years